The Magnificent Mile, sometimes referred to as The Mag Mile, is an upscale section of Chicago's Michigan Avenue, running from the Chicago River to Oak Street in the Near North Side. The district is located within downtown, and one block east of Rush Street. The Magnificent Mile serves as the main thoroughfare between Chicago's Loop business district and its Gold Coast. It is generally the western boundary of the Streeterville neighborhood, to its east and River North to the west.

Real estate developer Arthur Rubloff of Rubloff Company gave the district its nickname in the 1940s. , commercial rent on The Magnificent Mile is the third most expensive in the United States, behind Fifth Avenue in New York and Rodeo Drive in Beverly Hills.

There are many tall buildings, such as 875 North Michigan Avenue (formerly the "John Hancock Center"), in the district. Landmarks along the Magnificent Mile include Wrigley Building, Tribune Tower, the Chicago Water Tower, and the Allerton, Drake and Intercontinental Hotels.

History

After the Great Chicago Fire of 1871, State Street (anchored by Marshall Field's) in the downtown Loop, especially the Loop Retail Historic District, was the city's retailing center. The convenience of mass transit including streetcars and elevated trains, supported a retail corridor along State Street from Lake Street to Van Buren Street.

By the 1920s, commuter suburbs began to have significant retail districts.  Prior to the bascule bridge construction, swing bridges across the river were open for ship traffic during half the daylight hours.  The Rush Street Bridge was the swing bridge for this area.  The opening of the Michigan Avenue Bridge in 1920 created a new commercial district.

The concept for the Magnificent Mile was part of the 1909 Burnham Plan of Chicago. It was constructed during the 1920s to replace Pine Street, which had been lined with factories and warehouses near the river, and fine mansion and rowhouse residences farther north. The earliest building constructions varied in style, but challenged new heights in construction. The name the "Magnificent Mile" is a registered trademark of The Magnificent Mile Association, formerly the Greater North Michigan Avenue Association (GNMAA).

After the Great Depression and World War II, Arthur Rubloff and William Zeckendorf bought or controlled most of the property along this stretch of the avenue and supported a plan by Holabird & Root for construction of new buildings and renovation of old ones that took advantage of new zoning laws. Soon the property values driven by the luxury shopping districts were pricing out the nearby artists of Tower Town, just southwest of the Chicago Water Tower.  Rubloff and Zeckendorf successfully developed and promoted the area until it became one of the most prestigious addresses of the city. That distinction holds today, and spurred new investment along the Magnificent Mile and throughout the Near North Side.

After 1950, suburban development reduced the Loop's daily significance to many Chicagoans as downtown retail sales slipped. However, the Magnificent Mile kept a luxury shopping district close to the central business district.  The opening of the 74-story Water Tower Place in 1975 marked the return of Chicago to retailing prominence. By 1979, the State Street commercial corridor had lost its commercial vitality and was closed to street traffic for renovation including sidewalk widening until 1996. In August 2020, the Magnificent Mile was looted by large crowds during a night of unrest after Chicago police shot a black person in Englewood. In May 2022, a mass shooting nearby the neighborhood killed two people and critically injured eight others.

Description
Today, The Magnificent Mile contains a mixture of upscale department stores, restaurants, luxury retailers, residential and commercial buildings, financial services companies, and hotels, catering primarily to tourists and the affluent. The Magnificent Mile includes  of retail space, 460 stores, 275 restaurants, 51 hotels, and a host of sightseeing and entertainment attractions to more than 22 million visitors annually.

The American Planning Association selected The Magnificent Mile as one of the 10 Great Streets for 2007 through its Great Places in America program. In recent years, The Magnificent Mile has added trees and flower-filled medians to reflect the changing seasons.

Retail 
Many of the world's leading retail stores populate The Magnificent Mile, including luxury department stores Bloomingdale's, Neiman Marcus, Saks Fifth Avenue, Nordstrom, and the Flagship Macy's on State Street. In addition, some of the finest luxury boutiques are located along The Magnificent Mile (many of which have only a few North American locations), including Canada Goose, Cartier, Bottega Veneta, Bulgari, Van Cleef & Arpels, Armani, Chanel, Burberry (its U.S. flagship location), Saint Laurent, Tom Ford, Gucci, Prada, Jimmy Choo, Louis Vuitton, Escada, Christian Louboutin,  Tiffany & Co., Max Mara, Harry Winston, St. John, Omega, Stuart Weitzman, Montblanc, Anne Fontaine, Alice+Olivia, and Rolex.

Also present are Ralph Lauren (Ralph Lauren's largest store in the world), Kate Spade, Eskandar, Barbour, Cole Haan, Charles David, Lanvin, Marc Jacobs, Henri Bendel, Hugo Boss, Brunello Cucinelli, Dolce & Gabbana, Salvatore Ferragamo, L'Occitane en Provence, Diesel, Carolina Herrera, American Girl, Moncler, Furla, Harry Winston, Aritzia, Ermenegildo Zegna, Zara, Vera Wang, La Perla, MCM, Tumi, Agent Provocateur, L.K.Bennett, Dennis Basso, Lululemon, Piazza Sempione, Graff Diamonds, Fratelli Rosseti, Hickey Freeman, Kiehl's, Jil Sander, Henry Beguelin, Michael Kors, Bernadaud, Christofle, J. Crew, Arthur, Sermoneta, H&M, Manrico Cashmere, Marlowe, Paul Stuart, Graff Diamonds, David Yurman, Fogal, Wolford, The Art of Shaving, BHLDN, Buccellati,Victoria's Secret, Banana Republic, AllSaints, Starbucks Reserve Roastery (Largest Starbucks in the World), Frette, Pratesi, Uniqlo (Its first in the Midwest), and many others.

The Magnificent Mile is also notable for its three urban shopping centers: Water Tower Place, The Shops at North Bridge, and 900 North Michigan Shops. Each spans multiple floors and city blocks and offers various tenants: mall mainstays and more upscale apparel shops, restaurants, and unique attractions, such as museums. In its book The 10 Best of Everything: An Ultimate Guide for Travelers, National Geographic named The Magnificent Mile along with Rodeo Drive and Fifth Avenue as one of the 10 best shopping avenues in the world.

In 2011, rent on The Magnificent Mile is the third most expensive in the country, behind Fifth Avenue in New York and Rodeo Drive in Beverly Hills. In 2013 alone, rent rose 46%.

Hotels and dining 
Renowned and critically acclaimed restaurants such as The Signature Room at The 95th, Spiaggia, Tru, The Pump Room, Lawry's The Prime Rib, The Grand Lux, and The Park Hyatt Room provide a variety of dining options. Three 5-star hotels (The Peninsula Chicago, Four Seasons Hotel Chicago, and Ritz-Carlton Chicago) and Illinois' only 4-star hotel (Park Hyatt) are located within about five blocks along The Magnificent Mile.

Other hotels such as Intercontinental, Knickerbocker, Westin, Drake Hotel, and the Conrad Chicago offer convenient luxurious accommodations as well.  Selected luxury-class hotels are shown below:

Banks 
The largest banks have branches along the strip including the three largest banks in the nation: Bank of America, Citibank, and JPMorgan Chase's Chase Bank.  Additionally, the largest banks in Chicago are present, such as Harris Bank, which is technically across the street from The Magnificent Mile. American Express has a Magnificent Mile address for one of its two Chicago service offices. Fidelity Investments has an office at the foot of The Magnificent Mile.

Chicago landmarks 
Historic and landmark presences are shown in the table below, which lists Chicago Landmarks, National Register of Historic Places locations, and National Historic Landmarks along The Magnificent Mile. At the northern edge of this district on the west, one finds the exclusive One Magnificent Mile building and Oak Street running to the west. Also, at the northern edge of the district one finds the Chicago Landmark East Lake Shore Drive District, an extremely expensive and exclusive one-block area of real estate running east from N. Michigan Ave. and facing directly onto Lake Michigan.

At the southern edge of the district, the Michigan Avenue Bridge sits among four majestic 1920s skyscrapers, two of which are on The Magnificent Mile (Tribune Tower and the Wrigley Building), and two of which are not (333 North Michigan and London Guarantee Building). These buildings are contributing properties to the Michigan–Wacker Historic District.

Several of the tallest buildings in the world are located in The Magnificent Mile district. These buildings are:

Malls

Seasonal events

With each season, the ambiance of The Magnificent Mile changes. This change is signaled by several official events:

Median planters were constructed as part of a streetscape improvement project in 1994. In the spring, hundreds of thousands of tulips bloom from mid April until the end of May. In 2008, a public art installation of kinetic sculptures designed by local and international architects was placed in the garden beds.

During the summer, the "Gardens of The Magnificent Mile" festival event occurs. It is a self-guided landscape display walking tour. In 2007 and 2008, fashion dress forms graced the garden beds. The forms were designed by students from the Illinois Institute of Art – Chicago and the International Academy of Design and Technology, as well as prominent designers located on the Avenue.

In 2009 and 2010 the first ever Summer Concert Series presented by Walgreens brought top level musical talent to the Avenue for free lunchtime shows for guests, locals, and employees of the Avenue. Past artists include: Collective Soul, Better Than Ezra, Mat Kearney, Michael Franti, Kris Allen, and Guster.

The tradition of lighting the trees of The Magnificent Mile to start the Christmas season extends more than forty years. More than one million lights are lit and fireworks follow the event. The Magnificent Mile Lights Festival, presented by BMO Harris Bank, is the annual kick-off to Chicago's Christmas season.

The day of the event has special activities and offers across Magnificent Mile businesses, plus interactive holiday booths in Pioneer Court, and a free concert with free concerts featuring popular artists all afternoon on the Harris Stage (past artists have included Jason Mraz, Mitchel Musso, and KT Tunstall). In the evening, Mickey Mouse and Minnie Mouse lead a procession down Michigan Avenue from Oak Street to Wacker Drive, stopping at each block to light the trees. He brings along other Disney friends, marching bands, celebrities and more. It is considered the first annual Christmas procession of the year.

Transportation and infrastructure
North Michigan Avenue is a six-lane two-way street that is serviced by Chicago Transit Authority public buses along the Magnificent Mile that connect the area to the entire Chicago metropolitan area. It is also serviced by seasonal trolley service along the street, and the foot of the Magnificent Mile is serviced by seasonal water transit services. Two blocks west along State Street, the Chicago 'L' rapid transit services the street via its Red Line. Pedestrian traffic abounds along the broad sidewalks that are shielded by extensive, mature greenery that provides much of the friendly atmosphere.

In autumn 2011, North Michigan Avenue was completely repaved from the Chicago River to Oak Street with a durable stone-matrix asphalt pavement mix that incorporated high levels of recycled materials, including waste shingles, ground tire rubber, and asphalt millings, diverting some 800 tons of material from landfills. The $1 million project was completed without ever completely halting traffic on the street. In July 2012, the City of Chicago and CDOT were honored with the Environmental Leadership Award from the National Asphalt Pavement Association.

Intersections

References

External links

 The Magnificent Mile
 The Magnificent Mile Association

Central Chicago
Neighborhoods in Chicago
Streets in Chicago
Shopping malls in Chicago
Shopping districts and streets in the United States
Architecture in Chicago